DXDE-TV (channel 29) is a television station in Zamboanga City, Philippines, affiliated with One Sports. It is owned by Golden Broadcast Professionals, Inc. alongside TV5 affiliate DXGB-TV (channel 11). Both stations share studios and transmitter facilities at the GBPI Bldg., Campaner Street, Zamboanga City.

Currently, DXDE-TV broadcasts on analog while online on digital TV via eMedia and GBPI-TV 11 affiliate subchannels respectively.

See also
 One Sports
 List of One Sports stations

References

Television stations in Zamboanga City
One Sports (TV channel) stations